Zenas E. Crowell was a clipper ship captain and sat in the Great and General Court of Massachusetts.   He retired in 1885 and died the next year.  He was succeeded by Watson F. Hammond.

References

Members of the Massachusetts General Court
1886 deaths